See You in Court is a 2011 BBC One documentary series about celebrities taking libel action against the media.

Episodes

Episode 1: 29 March 2011 
Lembit Opik claims that national newspapers made him a figure of fun and caused him to lose his seat in the 2010 general election.
Sheryl Gascoigne claims that red top tabloids defamed her by printing quotes they said were from her ex-husband Paul and his mother.

Episode 2: 5 April 2011 
Uri Geller challenges red-top articles, and an American television programme, about his relationship with Michael Jackson and alleged connection to Martin Bashir.
Ali Dizaei claims newspapers have said things about him that are untrue. He was successful in receiving an apology and payout as a result of an article falsely accusing him of bigamy. He was convicted of a separate crime, for which he is serving a prison sentence.

Episode 3: 12 April 2011 
Ultramarathon runner Richard Donovan takes action against Forbes magazine for their coverage of his North Pole marathon, which he says in inaccurate and unsatisfactory.
Finsbury Park Mosque takes action against Policy Exchange in response to their claim that they distributed extremist literature.

Episode 4: 3 May 2011 
Simon Singh is taken to court over his claims about chiropractic.
Tristran Rogers

Episode 5: 10 May 2011 
George Galloway
Danielle Lloyd

Episode 6: 17 May 2011

References

External links

2011 British television series debuts
2011 British television series endings
2010s British documentary television series
BBC high definition shows
BBC television documentaries
2010s British television miniseries
2010s British legal television series
Defamation
English-language television shows